Plisson is a surname and may refer to:
 Auguste-Arthur Plisson (died 1832), French chemist
 Eugène Plisson, British fencer
 Jules Plisson (born 1991), French rugby union player
 Pascal Plisson, French screenwriter and documentary filmmaker
 Patrick Plisson (born 1952), French Grand Prix motorcycle road racer
 Philip Plisson (born 1947), French maritime photographer
 Philippe Plisson (born 1951), French politician